The Sabaragamuwa University of Sri Lanka is a public university in Belihuloya, Balangoda, Sri Lanka. It was founded on 20 November 1991 and consists of Nine faculties.

History

Palabaddala Monastic University
This ancient university was established by Kalikala Sahittya Sarvagna Pandita ParakramaBahu, the Second (1235–1271 AD) in the Dambadeniya period. Bhikku Dharmakirti held its chancellorship. Meanwhile, the monastic institution of higher education in Sabaragamuwa had been in the custody of Deva Pathiraja, the royal agent to the King Parakramabahu, the Second.

Recent years
During the early 1990s, the Sri Lankan government came up with the concept of "University Affiliated Colleges". The concept was triggered by social problems faced by the younger generation, in addition to several committee reports which made recommendations to the government on youth unrest. Based on these reports, the government decided to open new avenues for the younger generation by means of establishing diploma-awarding bodies, which were to be affiliated with several national universities.

The Sabaragamuwa Affiliated University College (SAUC) was one such institution formed in affiliation with the University of Sri Jayawardenepura. Established at Belihuloya in the Sabaragamuwa Province on 20 November 1991 under the Sabaragamuwa Province Affiliated University College Ordinance No. 14 of 1992, the SAUC was ceremoniously declared open by His Excellency R. Premadasa, then President of Sri Lanka, on 8 February 1992. Following the opening, academic programmes of the SAUC commenced on 7 May 1992.
 
Prof. Dayananda Somasundara, the founding director of the college, determined that the SAUC should become a national university. Guided by his motivation, the academic, administrative and non-academic staff, students, and the nearby communities actively contributed towards the development and promotion of SAUC into a national university. As a result, the government decided to elevate SAUC to the status of a national university, amalgamating the Uva Affiliated University College (UAUC) at Rahangala and the Buttala Affiliated University College (BAUC) as the Faculties of Agricultural Sciences and Applied Sciences respectively. (Before this amalgamation, the SAUC at Belihuloya and the UAUC at Buttala were affiliated to the University of Sri Jayawardenepura, while the UAUC at Rahangala was affiliated to the University of Peradeniya.) The directors of the UAUC and BAUC were the Rev. Elle Wimalananda Thero and Prof. Arthur Bamunuarachchi respectively.

Professor Dayananda Somasundara was appointed as the first vice-chancellor in 1995. He continued in the post till 2001.

The Faculty of Agricultural Sciences was functioning at Rahangala under difficult conditions until 2001. The main difficulty was the long distance between the university's main premises and Rahangala. In addition, the academic staff and students pleaded with the university administration to shift the Faculty of Agricultural Sciences from Rahangala to the main university premises at Belihuloya. In response, the faculty was moved to Belihuloya in 2001. Meanwhile, the Faculty of Applied Sciences was still operative in Buttala. In 2008 this, too, was moved from Buttala to the main university at Belihuloya for the same reasons.

At present, the university has Nine faculties – Agricultural Sciences, Applied Sciences, Geomatics, Management Studies, Social Sciences and Languages,Computing,Medicine 

SUSL has several other institutes and centres, which are in great demand. They offer programmes to undergraduate and postgraduate students and the wider community. The university practices a semester-based system and conducts most of its study programmes in the English medium. Although a bilingual medium (English/Sinhala or English/Tamil) instruction is available in the Faculty of Social Sciences and Languages, the proportion of students who follow study programmes in the Sinhala medium is on the decline.

Examples of the courses offered only by SUSL are the BSc degrees in Surveying Sciences, Agri-Business Management, Food Science and Technology, Tourism Management, Physical Education and Sports Sciences Management, Eco-Tourism Management, and many more. In addition to the above SUSL offers B.A. degrees and conducts postgraduate studies in subjects such as Ayurvedic Hospital Management, Indigenous Community Studies, Entrepreneurship and New Venture Creation etc. Students who follow these degree programmes benefit from these courses; this is as an incentive for the university to continue to introduce more innovative courses.

The university has signed several memoranda of understanding (MoUs) with international universities, and national and international organizations, with the primary intention of collaboratively raising standards of academic excellence. Among the international institutions that have ventured into a partnership with SUSL via MoUs are leading educational bodies such as Durham University, UK; Guilin University of Technology, China; Shivaji University, India; Gombe State University, Nigeria; and Gothenburg University, Sweden.

Campus

The SUSL is in the former Japanese expatriate village of the Samanalawewa project. Hence, from the inception of SUSL, some of the Samanalawewa project buildings became available. After expansion and renovation, this village became the hub of the university. Compared to its past, the university has achieved a high level of infrastructural development, including modern, state-of-the-art building complexes for its faculties. Management Studies, Social Sciences and Languages and Applied Sciences have received new building complexes, with up-to-date technology and facilities.

Upon the invitation of Prof. Mahinda S. Rupasinghe, the vice-chancellor of SUSL, the new building of the Faculty of Applied Sciences and the second stage of the faculty building of the Faculty of Social Sciences and Languages were ceremoniously declared opened by His Excellency Mahinda Rajapakshe, president of Sri Lanka on 31 March 2012. Also present were the Hon. S. B. Dissanayake, Minister of Higher Education, Hon. Nandimiththra Ekanayake, deputy minister of Higher Education and other honored guests.

Meanwhile, the construction of the new buildings complex for the Faculty of Geomatics and the playground and pavilion was completed as well. The Faculty of Agricultural Sciences had several new buildings, which were deemed adequate for its present requirements. In the future, a separate new building will be constructed for the Faculty of Agricultural Sciences to hold its growing student population. These infrastructural changes reflect steps taken towards the progress of the university.

Location 
SUSL is in the southern foothills of the central mountain range about 162 km from Colombo, on the Colombo–Badulla (A4) road. Administratively, SUSL belongs to the Imbulpe Divisional Secretariat and to the Ratnapura District in Sabaragamuwa Province. The university is 500 m from the Pambahinna Junction, on the A4 highway which runs through Belihuloya. The closest city to the university is Balangoda (18 km), the closest railway station is Haputale (31 km), while Bandarawela is the only 40 km from the university.

Organization 
The SUSL was established on 7 November 1995 by the Gazette Notification No. 896/2 and operates under the provisions of the Universities Act No. 16 of 1978 and the Universities (Amendment) Act No. 7 of 1985. SUSL was ceremonially declared open on 2 February 1996 by Her Excellency Chandrika Bandaranaike Kumaratunga, the president of Sri Lanka. The organizational structure represents a number of chief administrative positions such as chancellor, vice-chancellor, deans and many others, who plan for future development. They implement and monitor decisions taken by the overall management.

Chancellors 
Most Venerable Agga Maha Pandita Rev. Balangoda Ananda Maithriya Mahanayaka Thero
Dr. C. R. Panabokka 
Venerable Madithiyawela Wijithasena Thero 
Venerable Professor Kumburugamuwe Vajira Thero: (Present Chancellor)

The chancellor of the SUSL is the ceremonial head of the university and presides over the University Convocation. The chancellor is nominated by the president of Sri Lanka for five years.

Vice-chancellors 
 Prof. Dayananda Somasundara, 1995–2001
 Prof. I.K. Perera, 2001–2004
 Prof. Rohana P Mahaliyanaarachchi: 2005–2008
 Prof. Mahinda S Rupasinghe: 2008–2014
 Prof. Chandana P. Udawatte: 2014–2017
 Prof. M. Sunil Shantha: 2017-2020
 Prof. R.M.U.S.K. Rathnayake 2020 - to date

The president of Sri Lanka appoints the vice-chancellor out of three nominations made by the University Council for three years. The vice-chancellor is the principal Executive, Academic Officer, and Chief Accounting Officer of the university. The vice-chancellor is also the chairman and ex-officio member of the Council and the Senate of the University and is responsible for the maintenance of discipline and academic work.

Faculties

Faculty of Social Sciences and Languages

Department of Economics & Statistics
Department of Social Sciences
Department of Languages
Department of English Language Teaching
Department of Geography and Environmental Management

Faculty of Agriculture Sciences

Department of Agribusiness Management
Department of Export Agriculture
Department of Livestock Production

Faculty of Applied Sciences

Department of Physical Sciences
Department of Food Sciences and Technology
Department of Natural Resources
Department of Computing and Information Systems
Department of Sports Science and Management and Physical Education

Faculty of Geomatics 

Department of Surveying and Geodesy
Department of Remote Sensing & Geographic Information Systems (GIS)(RSGIS)(Former -> Department of Cartography, Photogrammetry, Remote Sensing and Geographic Information Systems (GIS))

Faculty of Management

Department of Marketing Management
Department of Business Management
Department of Accountancy and Finance
Department of Tourism Management

Faculty of Medicine

Faculty of Computing 

Department of Software Engineering

The Department of Software Engineering (DSE) at the Faculty of Computing, Sabaragamuwa University of Sri Lanka was established in 2022 by introducing BScHons Degree Programme in Software Engineering for the academic year 2019/2020. The mission of the DSE is to create professionals who can develop high-quality, cutting-edge, and cost-effective software systems. The internal academic staff comprises senior lecturers, lecturers who graduated from well-known national and international universities are specialized in core areas of software engineering.

The DSE offers a comprehensive undergraduate curriculum that prepares students to be industry leaders in Software Engineering and it is committed to producing professional Software Engineers carrying strong analytical and development skills necessary to meet the challenges of real life and play their role in building up the National Economy. The Department provides a forward-thinking approach in an inclusive environment that encourages students to become pioneers in the field by developing in-depth knowledge through the hands-on design of innovative products. As real-world construction of complex software systems is done by engineering teams, our curriculum focuses on team-based activities with an emphasis on collaboration and the design process. Students receive mentorship to become world-class engineers and to conduct world-class research by closely collaborating with both faculty and industry.

Department of Computing and Information Systems
Department of Data Science

Faculty of Graduate Studies 

 Department of Anatomy
 Department of Biochemistry
 Department of Physiology
Department of Medicine
Forensic Medicine & Toxicology
Department of Community Medicine
Department of Microbiology
Department of Obstetrics & Gynaecology
Department of Paediatrics
Department of Parasitology
Department of Pathology
Department of Pharmacology
Department of Primary Care & Family Medicine
Department of Psychiatry
Department of Surgery

Faculty of Technology 

 Department of Biosystems Technology
 Department of Engineering Technology

Development
Sabaragamuwa University is on track to a major development process in human and physical aspects. The vacancies in academic and non-academic staff are being filled to cater to the nation more effectively.

Meanwhile, the implementation of the Master Plan of the university has taken off giving fresh hopes of dawn of a new era. The university was awarded some 155.5 million rupees 2004/5 for improving the relevance and quality of undergraduates in higher education. This money is in addition to the annuals government funds received.

References

Universities in Sri Lanka
Educational institutions established in 1991
Buildings and structures in Sabaragamuwa Province
Statutory boards of Sri Lanka
Education in Sabaragamuwa Province
1991 establishments in Sri Lanka